Serge Lifar (Serhіy Mуkhailovуch Lуfar) ( 15 December 1986) was a Soviet ballet dancer and choreographer, famous as one of the greatest male ballet dancers of the 20th century.  Not only a dancer, Lifar was also a choreographer, director, writer, theoretician about dance, and collector.

As ballet master of the Paris Opera from 1930 to 1944, and from 1947 to 1958, he devoted himself to the restoration of the technical level of the Paris Opera Ballet, returning it to its place as one of the best companies in the world.

Biography

Early life and education
Lifar was born in Kyiv, Russian Empire. His year of birth is officially shown as 1904 (as on a 2004 Ukrainian stamp commemorating his centenary). 
He became the pupil of Bronislava Nijinska in her ballet studio «School of Movement» in Kyiv, 1920.

In 1921 he left Soviet Russia and was noticed by Sergei Diaghilev, who sent him to Turin in order to improve his technique with Enrico Cecchetti.

Ballets Russes
He made his debut at the Ballets Russes in 1923, where he became the principal dancer in 1925. Lifar was considered the successor to Nijinsky in the Ballets Russes. He was cast at the age of 21 opposite Tamara Karsavina in Nijinska's Roméo et Juliette (1926, score by Constant Lambert); Karsavina was twice his age. He originated leading roles in three Balanchine ballets for the Ballets Russes, including La Chatte (1927), with a score by French composer Henri Sauguet and based on an Aesop fable, which featured Lifar's famous entrance in a 'chariot' formed by his male companions; Ode by Léonide Massine and Apollon Musagète (1928) with a score by Stravinsky depicting the birth of the Greek God Apollo and his encounter with the three muses, Calliope, Polyhymnia, and Terpsichore; and Le Fils prodigue (The Prodigal Son) (1929), with a score by Sergei Prokofiev, the last great ballet of the Diaghilev era.

Paris Opéra Ballet
At the death of Diaghilev in 1929, Lifar at the age of 24 was invited by Jacques Rouché to take over the directorship of the Paris Opéra Ballet, which had fallen into decline in the late 19th century. Lifar gave the company a new strength and purpose, initiating the rebirth of ballet in France, and began to create the first of many ballets for that company. These were immediately successful, such as Les Créatures de Prométhée (1929), a personal version of Le Spectre de la rose (1931); and L'Après-midi d'un faune (1935); Icare (1935), with costumes and decor by Picasso; Istar (1941); and Suite en Blanc (1943), which he qualified as Neoclassical ballet.

As part of his effort to revitalize dance, Lifar thought the basic principles of ballet—specifically the five positions of the feet—denied mobility for the dancer. He codified two additional positions, known as the sixth and seventh positions, with the feet turned in, not out like the first five positions. The sixth and seventh positions were not Lifar's inventions, but revivals of positions that already existed in the eighteenth century, when there were ten positions of the feet in classical ballet; and their use is limited to Lifar's choreographies.

During his three decades as director of the Paris Opéra Ballet, Lifar led the company through the turbulent times of World War II and the German occupation of France. Lifar was a collaborationist under the occupation {Franko, "Serge Lifar and the Question of Collaboration with the German Authorities under the Occupation of Paris (1940-1949)," in Dance Research 35/2 (Winter 2017): 218-257}. Lifar's postwar trial resulted in his condemnation as a collaborator and his suspension from the national stage. During his absence, Balanchine was hired to replace him.
 
Returning to his former position, Lifar's presence was vehemently opposed by the Opera stagehands with the result that he was not allowed to appear on stage nor to consult with technical staff directly on any productions. Nevertheless, he brought the Paris Opéra Ballet to America and performed to full houses at the New York City Center despite protests. Audiences were enthusiastic and had great admiration for the company of dancers. He undoubtedly influenced Yvette Chauviré, Janine Charrat, and Roland Petit.

In 1958, Lifar was forced into retirement due to a strained relationship with the Opera management. A famous photograph was taken of Lifar leaving the Palais Garnier, after being forced to resign, looking somber and clasping the wings from the costume of Icarus that the character puts on in order to fly.

Later life
On 30 March 1958, at age 52, Lifar faced off against the 72-year-old impresario George de Cuevas in a duel in France. The duel was precipitated by an argument over changes to Black and White (Suite en blanc), a ballet by Lifar that was being presented by the Cuevas ballet company. Lifar had his face slapped in public after insisting that he retained the rights to Black and White. Lifar sent his seconds to Cuevas who refused to extend an apology and chose to duel with swords. As duels had been "technically outlawed" in the 17th century, the time and location of the duel were not disclosed to the public. The duel was conducted in front of 50 newspaper photographers and ended with the two combatants in tears and embraces in what The New York Times wrote "what may well have been the most delicate encounter in the history of French dueling," with the sole injury being a cut on Lifar's right forearm in the seventh minute.

In 1977 the Paris Opéra Ballet devoted a full evening to his choreography.

Death

He died in Lausanne, Switzerland, on 15 December 1986, aged 81, and was buried in Sainte-Geneviève-des-Bois Russian Cemetery.

Legacy

Editions Sauret published his memoirs, titled Les Mémoires d'Icare, posthumously in 1993. The title references one of his greatest roles in the ballet Icare. "The story of the ballet is based on the ancient Greek myth of Icarus, whose father Daedalus builds him a pair of artificial wings.  Disobeying his father's orders, Icarus flies too close to the sun, which melts the wax in his wings and causes him to plunge to his death."

The Serge Lifar Foundation was set up on 23 August 1989 by Lifar's companion, Countess Lillan Ahlefeldt-Laurvig. In 2012, jewels from the Countess' estate were auctioned at Sotheby's, with the proceeds going to the foundation.

In the summer of 1994 the First Lifar International Ballet Contest was held on the stage of the National Ukraine Opera. The Sixth Lifar International Ballet Competition was held in April 2006 and the seventh in Donetsk in March–April 2011.

Awards and honours
Commandeur des Arts et des Lettres
Chevalier de la Légion d'honneur (1983)

Books
In 1935 Lifar published his confessio fidei ("confession of faith") titled Le manifesto du chorégraphe, proposing laws about the independence of choreography.  Some of views include:

He also wrote a biography of Diaghilev titled Serge Diaghilev, His Life, His Work, His Legend: An Intimate Biography published by Putnam, London, 1940.

Cultural depictions
Anna Pavlova, film by Emil Loteanu; portrayed by Igor Sklyar (1983).

Further reading
Mark Franko, "Serge Lifar and the Question of Collaboration with the German Authorities under the Occupation of Paris (1940-1949)," in Dance Research 35(2) (in French) (Winter 2017): 218–257.
Mark Franko, «Serge Lifar et la question de la collaboration avec les autorités allemandes sous l’Occupation (1940-1949),» Vingtième siècle. Revue d'histoire, n°132 (Oct-Déc 2016): 27–41.
Jean Laurent & Julie Sazanova, Serge Lifar, rénovateur du ballet français, Paris, Buchet-Chastel, 1960.
The Diaghilev-Lifar Library, catalogue, Sotheby's, Monte-Carlo, 1975.
Ballet material and manuscripts from the Serge Lifar Collection, catalogue, Sotheby's, London, 1984
Alexander Schouvaloff, The Art of Ballets Russes: The Serge Lifar Collection of Theater Designs, Costumes, and Paintings at the Wadsworth Atheneum, Yale University, 1998.
Roger Leong (ed.), From Russia With Love: Costumes for the Ballets Russes 1909–1933, Australian Publishers, 2000, .
Laurence BENAÏM, Marie Laure de Noailles, la vicomtesse du bizarre, Paris, Grasset, 2001, .
Robert Aldrich & Garry Wotherspoon, Who’s Who in Gay and Lesbian History from Antiquity to World War II, Routledge, London, 2002, .
Stéphanie Corcy, La vie culturelle sous l'Occupation, Paris, Perrin, 2005.
Lynn Garafola, Legacies of Twentieth-century Dance, Weslyan University Press, Middletown, 2005
Cyril Eder, Les comtesse de la Gestapo, Paris, Grasset, 2006
Florence Poudru, Serge Lifar : La danse pour patrie, Hermann, 2007, .
Serge Lifar, musagète, DVD, 2008.
Frederic Spotts, The Shameful Peace: How French Artists and Intellectuals Survived the Nazi Occupation, Yale University Press, New York, 2008.
Jean-Pierre Pastori, Serge Lifar, la beauté du diable, ed. Fame Sa, 2009, .
Sjeng Scheijen Sergej Diaghilev, een leven voor de kunst. Amsterdam, Bert Bakker, 2009, .
Alan Riding, And the Show Went On: Cultural Life in Nazi-occupied Paris, 2010.

References

External links

Official site of Serge Lifar Foundation
Serge Lifar International Ballet Competitions and Festivals

Serge Lifar Musagète (film by Dominique Delouche, 2005)

1905 births
1986 deaths
Dancers from Kyiv
Ballet teachers
French ballet masters
Ballets Russes dancers
Burials at Sainte-Geneviève-des-Bois Russian Cemetery
Ukrainian choreographers
Ukrainian male ballet dancers
 Serge Lifar
Emigrants from the Russian Empire to France
Paris Opera Ballet étoiles
Paris Opera Ballet artistic directors
Emigrants from the Russian Empire to Switzerland
White Russian emigrants to Switzerland
White Russian emigrants to France
20th-century ballet dancers